Noir (Hangul: 느와르) is a South Korean boy band formed by Luk Factory in Seoul. The group debuted on April 9, 2018, with the album Twenty's Noir. Their first official music video was for the track "Gangsta".

Members
Adapted from the official website.
Shin Seung-hoon (신승훈) – Leader, vocalist, rapper 
Kim Yeon-kuk (김연국) – Vocalist
Lee Jun-yong (이준용) – Vocalist
Nam Yun-sung (남윤성) – Vocalist, rapper
Kim Si-heon (김시헌) – Vocalist
Ryu Ho-yeon (유호연) – Rapper, dancer
Yang Si-ha (양시하) – Vocalist
Kim Min-hyuk (김민혁) – Rapper, dancer
Kim Dae-won (김대원) – Vocalist, dancer

Discography

Extended plays

Music Videos
 As A Star (2018)
 Gangsta (2018)
 Airplane Mode (2018)
 Doom Doom (2019)
 Lucifer (2020)

References

K-pop music groups
South Korean boy bands
South Korean dance music groups
Musical groups from Seoul
Musical groups established in 2018
2018 establishments in South Korea
South Korean pop music groups